Salix excelsa is a species of flowering plant in the willow family Salicaceae. It is native to the Caucasus, Central Asia (except Kyrgyzstan), Iran, Afghanistan, and Pakistan, and has been introduced to the Levant, Yemen, the Himalayas, and India. It is closely related to Salix acmophylla. It is used as a street tree in Georgia and Iran.

References

excelsa
Flora of the Caucasus
Flora of Central Asia
Flora of Iran
Flora of Afghanistan
Flora of Pakistan
Plants described in 1774